Ondřej Fiala (born 4 November 1987, Šternberk) is a Czech former professional ice hockey player, who most notably played for Orli Znojmo in the Austrian Hockey League (EBEL).

Playing career
After playing in the Czech league he went to North America and played in the Western Hockey League for three years with the Everett Silvertips and the Saskatoon Blades. Fiala was selected 40th overall in the second round of the 2006 NHL Entry Draft by the Minnesota Wild. Fiala featured in his native Czech Republic, with HC Oceláři Třinec in the Czech Extraliga and also endured a short stint in the Russian Kontinental Hockey League with HC Spartak Moscow.

On April 28, 2012, Fiala left KLH Chomutov of the 1. národní hokejová liga and joined Czech based, Orli Znojmo of the EBEL.

Career statistics

Regular season and playoffs

International

References

External links

1987 births
Living people
People from Šternberk
Czech ice hockey left wingers
Czech expatriate ice hockey players in Russia
Everett Silvertips players
Orli Znojmo players
HC Spartak Moscow players
Minnesota Wild draft picks
Molot-Prikamye Perm players
Piráti Chomutov players
Saskatoon Blades players
Sportspeople from the Olomouc Region
Czech expatriate ice hockey players in Canada
Czech expatriate ice hockey players in the United States